is the lead anime character designer for the Pokémon anime series, although she has worked on other animation titles. Her work closely follows Ken Sugimori to transfer Pokémon and Ken's characters into the anime. Sayuri also designs characters exclusive to the anime.

Works 
 Pokémon (TV) : Character design
 Pokémon: The First Movie : Character design 
 Pokémon: The Movie 2000 : Character design 
 Pokémon 3: The Movie : Character design 
 Pokémon 4Ever : Character design
 Pokémon Heroes : Character design 
 Pokémon: Jirachi Wish Maker : Character design
 Pokémon: Destiny Deoxys : Character design 
 Pokémon: Lucario and the Mystery of Mew : Character design
 Pokémon Ranger and the Temple of the Sea : Character design
 Agatha Christie's Great Detectives Poirot and Marple : Character design
 Ushio & Tora: Comically Deformed Theater : Character design

References

External links 
 
 Sayuri Ichiishi anime at Media Arts Database 

Japanese animators
Japanese women animators
Anime character designers
Living people
1964 births
Pokémon